Thunder in the Glens is an annual Harley-Davidson bike rally held in Aviemore, Scotland, established in 1996. The event is run by the Dunedin Chapter Scotland (#9083) of the Harley Owners Group (HOG), based in Edinburgh. Running over the last weekend of August every year, the event consists of Harley-Davidson displays, rallies and live music. Scottish rock band Big Country, and band RPJ performed at the 2016 festival. People travel from around the world to attend.

Thunder in the Glens is currently the largest HOG chapter rally in the United Kingdom and Europe. Although mainly for Harley-Davidson bikes, the event is open to all bikers.

The rally on the Saturday consists of an organised ride from Aviemore through the Scottish Highlands to Grantown on Spey.

When the event first started, there were around 200 participants in the rally. In 2015, there was over 3000 bikers, and by 2016, it rose to 4000.

There are over 60 charity stands at the event, as well as opportunities to test bikes and Jeep cars. The profits from Thunder go to local charities.

The event is said to substantially boost the local economy of the town of Aviemore. It was suggested the event contributed £15million to the Aviemore economy in 2016. Although local residents were initially hesitant about the event, nervous the bikers would be similar to those depicted in films such as The Wild One, the bikers are now welcomed into the town every year.

In 2016, Thunder in the Glens celebrated its 20th anniversary.

References

External links 
 Dunedin Chapter Scotland Official Website

Motorcycle rallies in the United Kingdom
Rock festivals in the United Kingdom
Recurring events established in 1996
1996 establishments in Scotland